is Eiko Shimamiya's fourth single produced by I've Sound and Geneon Entertainment label. It is set to be released on April 8, 2009, a year after releasing her third single "Wheel of Fortune".

The single's catalog number is FCCJ-0003 for the regular CD-only edition since it won't be having a limited CD+DVD edition. Overall, this will be Shimamiya's fourth tie-in with the Higurashi no Naku Koro ni series.

Track listing 

—4:41
Composition: Tomoyuki Nakazawa
Arrangement: Tomoyuki Nakazawa, Takeshi Ozaki
Lyrics: Eiko Shimamiya
OXISOLS—5:15
Composition/Arrangement: SORMA No.1
Lyrics: Eiko Shimamiya
 -instrumental- -- 4:36
OXISOLS -instrumental- -- 5:12

Charts and sales

2009 singles
Eiko Shimamiya songs
Song recordings produced by I've Sound
2009 songs
Japanese film songs